Princess Zenani Mandela-Dlamini (born 5 February 1959) is a South African diplomat and traditional aristocrat. She is the sister-in-law of the King of eSwatini, Mswati III, and the daughter of Nelson Mandela and his second wife, Winnie Mandela.

Early life

Zenani Mandela was born into a family of chieftains. Her father, Nelson, was a direct descendant of the holders of the kingship of the Thembu people and was himself the heir to the chieftaincy of Mvezo. His grandson, Zenani's nephew Mandla, eventually succeeded to the latter title.

She was nearly born in prison, as Winnie Mandela was arrested close to her birth in 1959, and when she was four her father was sent to prison, where he would stay for the next 27 years. Not until 1974, when she was 15 years old, could she visit him.

Education

Mandela-Dlamini studied at Waterford Kamhlaba United World College of Southern Africa and science at Boston University. It was there that she first met Prince Thumbumuzi Dlamini of Swaziland (an elder brother of the reigning monarch of Swaziland, Mswati III and of Queen Mantfombi of the Zulus), who was studying science at the same university. The two married in 1973 and had four children – daughters Zaziwe (1977) and Zamaswazi (1979) and sons Zinhle (1980) and Zozuko (1992) – and six grandchildren, but are currently separated. Her husband had several other children from a previous marriage, Prince Cedza Dlamini being one of them. They are co-owners of Mandela, Dlamini and Associates (International Business Consultants).

Later activity

Mandela-Dlamini was appointed ambassador for South Africa to Argentina in July 2012, (taking office in October), becoming the first of Mandela's children to enter public service; she succeeded retiring diplomat and former opposition leader Tony Leon. She served in this position until 2017, when she was appointed South African high commissioner to Mauritius.
Princess Zenani Mandela-Dlamini was appointed as the South African Ambassador to South Korea in October 2019.

After Mandela was elected president and his divorce to Winnie, Zenani was chosen to accompany her father to his inauguration and become the stand-in First Lady of South Africa until her father remarried on his 80th birthday to former Mozambique first lady Graça Machel.

References

External links

1959 births
Living people
Boston University alumni
Waterford Kamhlaba alumni
People educated at a United World College
Ambassadors of South Africa to Argentina
Ambassadors of South Africa to Paraguay
Ambassadors of South Africa to Uruguay
Ambassadors of South Africa to South Korea
South African women diplomats
Zenani
Place of birth missing (living people)
South African women ambassadors